The 1500 metres or 1,500-metre run (typically pronounced 'fifteen-hundred metres') is the foremost middle distance track event in athletics. The distance has been contested at the Summer Olympics since 1896 and the World Championships in Athletics since 1983. It is equivalent to 1.5 kilometers or approximately  miles. The event is closely associated with its slightly longer cousin, the mile race, from which it derives its nickname "the metric mile".

The demands of the race are similar to that of the 800 metres, but with a slightly higher emphasis on aerobic endurance and a slightly lower sprint speed requirement. The 1500 metre race is predominantly aerobic, but anaerobic conditioning is also required.

Each lap run during the world-record race run by Hicham El Guerrouj of Morocco in 1998 in Rome, Italy averaged just under 55 seconds (or under 13.8 seconds per 100 metres). 

1,500 metres is three and three-quarter laps around a 400-metre track. During the 1970s and 1980s this race was dominated by British runners, along with an occasional Finn, American, or New Zealander. Through the 1990s, many African runners began to win Olympic medals in this race, especially runners from Kenya, Ethiopia, and East Africa, as well as North African runners from Morocco and Algeria. In the 2020s, European runners began to emerge again in the men's event, with Jakob Ingebrigtsen, the youngest of a dynasty of Norwegian middle-distance runners, winning Olympic Gold in 2021, and Scottish and British runner Jake Wightman winning the World Championship title the following year at the head of an all-European podium. Faith Kipyegon of Kenya maintained Africa's grip on the global titles in the female event in the same time period, although here again, Europeans Sifan Hassan and Laura Muir, and Americans such as Jenny Simpson also contended for the podium.

In the Modern Olympic Games, the men's 1,500-metre race has been contested from the beginning, and at every Olympic Games since. The first winner, in 1896, was Edwin Flack of Australia, who also won the first gold medal in the 800-metre race. The women's 1,500-metre race was first added to the Summer Olympics in 1972, and the winner of the first gold medal was Lyudmila Bragina of the Soviet Union. During the Olympic Games of 1972 through 2008, the women's 1,500-metre race has been won by three Soviets plus one Russian, one Italian, one Romanian, one Briton, one Kenyan, and two Algerians. The 2012 Olympic results are still undecided as a result of multiple doping cases.  The best women's times for the race were controversially set by Chinese runners, all set in the same race on just two dates four years apart at the Chinese National Games.  At least one of those top Chinese athletes has admitted to being part of a doping program.  This women's record was finally broken by Genzebe Dibaba of Ethiopia in 2015.

In American high schools, the 1,600-metre run, also colloquially referred to as "metric mile", is the designated official distance by the National Governing Body the NFHS.  Because of the legacy, since US customary units are better-known in America, the mile run (which is 1609.344 metres in length) is more frequently run than the 1,500-metre run.  For convenience, national rankings are standardized by converting all 1,500-metre run times to their mile run equivalents.

Strategy
Many 1500 metres events, particularly at the championship level, turn into slow, strategic races, with the pace quickening and competitors jockeying for position in the final lap to settle the race in a final sprint. Such is the difficulty of maintaining the pace throughout the duration of the event, most records are set in planned races led by pacemakers or "rabbits" who sacrifice their opportunity to win by leading the early laps at a fast pace before dropping out.

Continental records
Updated 19 August 2021.

All-time top 25

Men
Correct as of July 2022.

Women
Correct as of August 2022.

Annulled marks
Mariem Selsouli of Morocco ran 3:56.15 in 2012. This performance was annulled due to doping offences.

Men (indoor) 

 Correct as of February 2023.

Women (indoor) 

 Correct as of February 2023.

Olympic medalists

Men

Women

World Championships medalists

Men

Women

European Championships medalists

Men

Women

World Indoor Championships medalists

Men

Women

 Known as the World Indoor Games

Season's bests

Men

Women

"i" indicates performance on 200m indoor track

Other sports
1,500 metres is also an event in swimming, speed skating, and wheelchair racing.  The world records for the distance in swimming for men are 14:31.02 (swum in a 50-metre pool) by Sun Yang, 14:08.06 (swum in a 25-metre pool) by Gregorio Paltrinieri; and by women 15:25.48 (swum in a 50-metre pool) by Katie Ledecky, and 15:19.71 (swum in a 25-metre pool) by Mireia Belmonte García.

The world records for the distance in speed skating are 1:40.17 by Kjeld Nuis and 1:49.83 by Miho Takagi.

The records for wheelchair racing vary by disability classification:
T51: 4:53.50 by Hélder Mestre
T52: 3:29.79 by Raymond Martin
T53 and T54: 2:51.84 by Brent Lakatos

Notes and references

External links

IAAF list of 1500-metres records in XML
Statistics

 
Events in track and field
Middle-distance running
Summer Olympic disciplines in athletics